Bernie A. Shively (May 26, 1902 – December 10, 1967) was an American college football player, coach, and college athletics administrator. He was the athletic director at the University of Kentucky from 1938 until his death.

Shively served as an assistant football coach at Kentucky and was interim head football coach in 1945, prior to hiring Bear Bryant. Shively was linked to a scholarship scandal in 1962 involving the infamous football team known as the Thin Thirty, coached by Charlie Bradshaw.

Shively attended the University of Illinois. where he played football as a guard alongside Red Grange. He was a consensus All-American in 1926. He is a member of the College Football Hall of Fame, and is honored at Kentucky as the namesake of the track and field stadium.

Shively died on December 10, 1967, at Saint Joseph Hospital in Lexington, Kentucky.

Head coaching record

References

External links
 

1902 births
1967 deaths
American football guards
Illinois Fighting Illini football players
Kentucky Wildcats athletic directors
Kentucky Wildcats football coaches
All-American college football players
College Football Hall of Fame inductees
People from Paris, Illinois
Coaches of American football from Illinois
Players of American football from Illinois